Tom Irwin (born June 1, 1956) is an American film, television, and stage actor. Irwin is best known for his roles as Adrian Powell in the Lifetime comedy-drama series Devious Maids and as Graham Chase in the mid-1990s drama My So-Called Life.

Early life and education
Born in Peoria, Illinois, Irwin graduated from Illinois State University in Normal, Illinois. He joined the Steppenwolf Theatre Company in 1979, where he performed alongside Laurie Metcalf, John Malkovich, Joan Allen, and Gary Sinise.

Career 
Irwin has been on the faculty of The Theatre School at DePaul University and Columbia College Chicago. He is a class instructor at Steppenwolf Theatre Company West School of Drama in Los Angeles. He has appeared in over thirty Steppenwolf productions, and won a Joseph Jefferson Award for his performance as Tom in Steppenwolf's production of The Glass Menagerie.

His first starring television role was in 1991, in the short-lived ABC television series, My Life and Times. He starred as Graham Chase, the soft-spoken father in the 1994 ABC television series My So-Called Life. He has had numerous television acting appearances, including Angel, ER, and Lost. He had a regular role on the television series Saving Grace for three seasons, beginning in 2007. He made his Broadway debut in 1990 in The Grapes of Wrath. Irwin, who has also appeared in various movie roles, lives in Los Angeles, California. In 2002 he played the part of Gerry in London's West End production of Up for Grabs with Madonna. In 1999, he starred in No Higher Love, with Katey Sagal and Annabeth Gish, about a woman with a terminal illness who chooses someone to take over for her as wife and mother.

From 2013 to 2016, Irwin starred opposite Rebecca Wisocky in the four seasons that were produced of the Lifetime television comedy-drama series Devious Maids.

Filmography

Vital Signs (1986) (TV) as Dr. #2 
Crime Story as Mayor Billy Haynes (1 episode, 1986) 
Jack and Mike as Hogan (1 episode, 1987) 
Midnight Run (1988) as FBI Agent Perry
Light of Day (1987) as Reverend Ansley 
China Beach as Bellows (1 episode, 1989) 
In the Best Interest of the Child (1990) (TV) as Frank 
To My Daughter (1990) (TV) as Mark Sheridan
Men Don't Leave (1990) as Gary 
My Life and Times as Ben Miller (6 episodes, 1991) 
Deceived (1991) as Harvey
Ladykiller (1992) (TV) as Vinnie
Country Estates (1993) (TV) as Sam Reed
Mr. Jones (1993) as Dr. Patrick Shaye
Nurses on the Line: The Crash of Flight 7 (1993) (TV) as Eddie 
Without Consent (1994) (TV) as Robert Mills
My So-Called Life as Graham Chase (19 episodes, 1994-1995) 
Innocent Victims (1996) (TV) as Jerry Beaver
A Step Toward Tomorrow (1996) as Dr. Decker
My Very Best Friend (1996) (TV) as Alex
Holiday Affair (1996) (TV) as Paul Davis
When Husbands Cheat (1998) (TV) as Craig McCall
In Quiet Night (1998) as Dr. Leonard Wolcott
The Girl Next Door (1998) (TV) as Craig Mitchell
God's New Plan (1999) (TV) as Brian Young
The Haunting (1999) as Lou 
The Sky's on Fire (1999) (TV) as Dr. Aaron Schiffren 
The Outer Limits as Dr. Ian Michaels (1 episode, 1999) 
The Sandy Bottom Orchestra (2000) (TV) as Norman Green
Touched by an Angel as Will Harris (1 episode, 2001) 
The Division as FBI Agent Aubrey Harrick (1 episode, 2001) 
Frasier as Frank (1 episode, 2001) 
Snow White: The Fairest of Them All (2001) (TV) as John
CSI: Crime Scene Investigation as Roy Logan (1 episode, 2002) 
Angel as Elliot (1 episode, 2002) 
Without a Trace as Barry Mashburn (2 episodes, 2003) 
Miracles as Larry Kettridge (1 episode, 2003) 
21 Grams (2003) as Dr. Jones
Exposed (2003) as Parsons, Erik
ER as Gabriel Milner (1 episode, 2005) 
Numb3rs as Dr. Stephen Atwood (1 episode, 2005) 
Judging Amy as Oliver Cecil (1 episode, 2005) 
The Closer as Congressman Hilton (1 episode, 2005) 
Reunion as Mr. Noll (1 episode, 2005) 
Ghost Whisperer as Steve Harper (1 episode, 2005) 
7th Heaven as Rob (1 episode, 2005)
Related as Joe Sorelli (13 episodes, 2005-2006) 
Fool Me Once (2006) as Donald
Who You Know (2007) as Karl
Private Practice as Father Mark (1 episode, 2007) 
Danny Fricke (2008) (TV) as Gary Stockwell
Marley & Me (2008) as Dr. Sherman
Eli Stone as Judge Gaitin (1 episode, 2008) 
24 as John Brunner (1 episode, 2009) 
Timer (2009) as Paul Depaul
Lost as Dan Norton (2 episodes, 2009) 
Saving Grace as Father John Hanadarko (19 episodes, 2007-2010) 
Privileged (2010) as Mr. Carrington 
Grey's Anatomy as Marty Hancock (3 episodes, 2010-2011) 
Castle as Simon Campbell (1 episode, 2011) 
The Chicago Code as Ted Langley (1 episode, 2011) 
Law & Order: Special Victims Unit as Jerry Bullard (1 episode, season 12 episode 19 "Bombshell")
The Bling Ring (2011) (TV) as Detective Archie Fishman
Least Among Saints (2012) as Dr. Joseph Hunter
House of Lies as Matt (1 episode, 2012) 
Devious Maids as Adrian Powell (2013-2016)
Criminal Minds as Sgt. Joe Mahaffey (1 episode, 2013) 
Chasing Life as Thomas Carver (2014-2015)
How to Get Away with Murder (season 4) as Spivey (1 episode, season 4, 2018)
The Morning Show as Fred Micklen (10 episodes, 2019)

References

External links

1956 births
Living people
American male film actors
American male television actors
Actors from Peoria, Illinois
Illinois State University alumni
20th-century American male actors
21st-century American male actors
Male actors from Illinois
DePaul University faculty
Columbia College Chicago faculty
Steppenwolf Theatre Company players